The Reason is the second major-label EP (and third overall) by American rock band X Ambassadors, released on January 27, 2014. It spawned the single Jungle. This EP also includes track Unsteady.

Composition 
Musically, The Reason has been described as an album with elements of trap music and indie pop, with "a country vibe to it". X Ambassadors member Sam Harris cited rock singer Bruce Springsteen as a big influence on the album.

In an interview with The Emory Wheel, the band commented on their inspirations: "We've always tried to write songs for anyone who feels marginalized, underrepresented: [people] who feel like they're different or are unable to speak up for themselves. A lot of the songs off of VHS and our previous EP, The Reason, were written with that in mind." According to Craig D. Lindsey of The News & Observer, the running theme through the EP is Sam Harris' struggling with self-doubt.

On January 30, 2014, X Ambassadors posted a message on their Facebook account about the goal of the EP. They stated that The Reason is their attempt to tell a story "about someone who gave up chasing a dream and who had the courage to start over."

Promotion and release 
On January 23, 2014, the band released a three-minute preview of the upcoming EP.

Critical reception 
Jeffrey Howard of Campus Times described it as a "pretty interesting" album. Tina Roumeliotis of Buzznet wrote a positive review about the EP, stating "[t]he bravery runs rampant in this release and it has me quite inspired".

Track listing 
All songs composed by X Ambassadors.

Charts

References 

2014 EPs
X Ambassadors albums
Kidinakorner albums